Olivia Gruver (born July 29, 1997) is an American  female Pole vault athlete. Gruver represented Team USA at 2019 Pan Am Games where she placed 4th. Gruver won two NCAA pole vault titles and seven NCAA Division I All-American awards. As a Husky, Gruver set a College outdoor pole vault record.

Professional
Gruver signed with Nike, Inc in 2020.

NCAA track and field
Gruver is a seven time NCAA Division I All-American award honoree.

As a Husky, Gruver won 2019 Stanford Invitational in a College record.

As a Wildcat, Gruver won 2018 NCAA Division I Outdoor Track and Field Championships and 2017 NCAA Division I Outdoor Track and Field Championships pole vault titles. 

Olivia Gruver cleared  on her second attempt to eclipse the 2015 record of  set by former Arkansas Razorback champion Sandi Morris at the Southeastern Conference Outdoor Championships.

Video of Olivia Gruver pole vaulting at 2019 University of Washington Indoor Invitation

Franklin High school
Olivia Gruver won the 2014 indoor, 2014 outdoor, and 2015 indoor track and field Maryland State pole vault titles, jumped  at the 2014 Maryland Public Secondary Schools Athletic Association state championships to earn individual title in the Pole vault for Franklin High School (Reisterstown, Maryland). Gruver had personal best of High jump , Pole vault , Long jump , Triple jump .

References

External links

Olivia Gruver – Franklin HS at Athletic.net
Olivia Gruver – University of Kentucky at Athletic.net

Olivia Gruver  – 2019 Track and Field profile at University of Washington
Olivia Gruver  – 2018 Track and Field profile at University of Kentucky
Olympic Dreams: Olivia Gruver at KING-TV

1997 births
Living people
American female pole vaulters
Sportspeople from Baltimore County, Maryland
Track and field athletes from Maryland
Kentucky Wildcats women's track and field athletes
Washington Huskies women's track and field athletes
Athletes (track and field) at the 2019 Pan American Games
Pan American Games track and field athletes for the United States